Tahitótfalu is a village in the northern part of , Hungary.

The Danube of Szentendre separates into two parts, one of these is Tótfalu which laying on Szentendre Island the other one is Tahi at the foothills of Visegrád Mountains, 28 kilometers from Budapest, north of Szentendre, along Highway 11.

References

Populated places in Pest County